Kenneth William Horne (25 June 1926 – 3 September 2015) was an English professional footballer and coach, best remembered for his 11 years in the Football League with Brentford, for whom he made over 220 appearances. He was inducted into the club's Hall of Fame in 2015.

Playing career

Early years 
A right half, Horne began his career as an amateur with First Division club Wolverhampton Wanderers, failing to make a first team appearance and moving to fellow top-flight club Blackpool in 1947. Despite being described as "a player of great promise", an abundance of right halves at the club saw Horne right down the pecking order and he failed to make a first team appearance for the Tangerines. He departed the club in 1950.

Brentford 
Horne signed for Second Division club Brentford in 1950 and made his debut in a 0–0 draw with Leicester City at Griffin Park on 18 November 1950. He made 20 appearances during the second half of the 1950–51 season and was converted into a full back. He established himself in the team during the 1951–52 season and made 38 appearances. Horne scored his only league goal for the club in a 3–3 draw with Luton Town on 1 March 1952, after being named in the team as a centre forward.

Horne made just 10 appearances in each of the 1952–53 and 1953–54 seasons, before the Bees' relegation to the Third Division South saw him regain a regular place in the team and he made 41 appearances during the 1954–55 season. Horne and teammates Billy Sperrin, George Bristow and Reg Newton were rewarded for their loyalty to the Bees with a testimonial against an International Managers XI in 1956.

Horne switched to the left back position during the 1958–59 season and made a career-high 48 appearances. Horne moved to across to right back during the 1959–60 season (making way for Ken Coote) and made 22 appearances in what was to be his penultimate season at Griffin Park. Horne failed to appear at all during the 1960–61 season and departed the club at the end of the campaign, having made 239 appearances and scored one goal during his 11 years with Brentford.

Dover 
Horne joined Southern League First Division club Dover in 1961 and ended his career with a three-year spell.

Coaching career 
Horne held youth coaching positions at Queens Park Rangers and Brentford and also undertook scouting work for the latter club.

Personal life 
Horne was married to Joyce and during his early years with Brentford, he worked in the town's market. He was diagnosed with pancreatic cancer at age 65 and underwent surgery which prolonged his life. Horne died on 3 September 2015, aged 89.

Career statistics

Honours 
 Brentford Hall of Fame

References

1926 births
Sportspeople from Burton upon Trent
English footballers
Brentford F.C. players
English Football League players
Wolverhampton Wanderers F.C. players
Blackpool F.C. players
Southern Football League players
Dover F.C. players
Association football wing halves
Association football fullbacks
Queens Park Rangers F.C. non-playing staff
Brentford F.C. non-playing staff
2015 deaths
Stapenhill F.C. players